White Park is a  public park on the west side of central Concord, New Hampshire. It occupies a roughly polygonal parcel of land surrounded by predominantly residential streets, with the University of New Hampshire School of Law located across White Street from the park's eastern corner. The park's major features include a large man-made pond, and there are active recreational facilities, including basketball and handball courts, and a baseball diamond. The traditional main gate is located at the junction of Washington and Centre streets, with a wall section that includes a built-in structure originally used as a covered shelter for a streetcar stop. The pond is transformed into an outdoor skating rink in winter. The park is also home to the city's largest playground, called the Monkey Around Playground.

The park was established by a donation from Armenia White, a local philanthropist, and designed by Charles Eliot. Most of its basic landscaping, including the construction of two ponds, was completed in the 1890s. A number of the plantings lining the park's Washington Street boundary date to the initial period of development, and include several specimen trees and shrubs. The park's recreational facilities were expanded in the 1930s with funding from the Works Progress Administration, at which time the smaller of the two ponds was filled in, and replaced by a swimming pool. The park was listed on the National Register of Historic Places in 1982.

See also
White Farm, owned by the White family
National Register of Historic Places listings in Merrimack County, New Hampshire
 New Hampshire Historical Marker No. 147: White Park
 New Hampshire Historical Marker No. 148: Sunset Baseball

References

External links
White Park - City of Concord

Parks on the National Register of Historic Places in New Hampshire
Buildings and structures completed in 1884
Concord, New Hampshire
Parks in Merrimack County, New Hampshire
National Register of Historic Places in Concord, New Hampshire